Andreas Wistuba (born 4 March 1967) is a German taxonomist and botanist specialising in the carnivorous plant genera Heliamphora and Nepenthes.  More than half of all known Heliamphora species have been described by Wistuba.

Publications
 Nerz, J. & A. Wistuba 1994. Five new taxa of Nepenthes (Nepenthaceae) from North and West Sumatra. Carnivorous Plant Newsletter 23(4): 101–114.
 Wistuba, A. & H. Rischer 1996. Nepenthes lavicola, a new species of Nepenthaceae from the Aceh Province in the North of Sumatra. Carnivorous Plant Newsletter 25(4): 106–111.
 Nerz, J. & A. Wistuba 2000. Heliamphora hispida (Sarraceniaceae), a new species from Cerro Neblina, Brazil-Venezuela. Carnivorous Plant Newsletter 29(2): 37–41.
 Wistuba, A., P. Harbarth & T. Carow 2001. Heliamphora folliculata, a new species of Heliamphora (Sarraceniaceae) from the ‘Los Testigos’ Table Mountains in the South of Venezuela. Carnivorous Plant Newsletter 30(4): 120–125.
 Wistuba, A., T. Carow & P. Harbarth 2002. Heliamphora chimantensis, a New Species of Heliamphora (Sarraceniaceae) from the ‘Macizo de Chimanta’ in the South of Venezuela. Carnivorous Plant Newsletter 31(3): 78–82.
 Carow, T., A. Wistuba & P. Harbarth 2005.   Heliamphora sarracenioides, a New Species of Heliamphora (Sarraceniaceae) from Venezuela. Carnivorous Plant Newsletter 34(1): 4–6.
 Wistuba, A., T. Carow, P. Harbarth & J. Nerz 2005. Heliamphora pulchella, eine neue mit Heliamphora minor (Sarraceniaceae) verwandte Art aus der Chimanta Region in Venezuela. Das Taublatt 53(3): 42–50.
 Nerz, J. & A. Wistuba 2006. Heliamphora exappendiculata, a clearly distinct species with unique characteristics. Carnivorous Plant Newsletter 35(2): 43–51.
 Nerz, J., A. Wistuba & G. Hoogenstrijd 2006. Heliamphora glabra (Sarraceniaceae), eine eindrucksvolle Heliamphora Art aus dem westlichen Teil des Guayana Schildes. Das Taublatt 54: 58–70.
 Wistuba, A., J. Nerz & A. Fleischmann 2007. Nepenthes flava, a new species of Nepenthaceae from the northern part of Sumatra. Blumea 52: 159–163.
 Nerz, J. & A. Wistuba 2007. Nepenthes mantalingajanensis (Nepenthaceae), eine bemerkenswerte neue Spezies aus Palawan (Philippinen). Das Taublatt 55(3): 17–25.
 Fleischmann, A., A. Wistuba & J. Nerz. 2009. Three new species of Heliamphora (Sarraceniaceae) from the Guayana Highlands of Venezuela. Willdenowia 39(2): 273–283. 
 Gronemeyer, T., A. Wistuba, V. Heinrich, S. McPherson, F. Mey & A. Amoroso 2010. Nepenthes hamiguitanensis (Nepenthaceae), a new pitcher plant species from Mindanao Island, Philippines. In: S.R. McPherson Carnivorous Plants and their Habitats. Redfern Natural History Productions Ltd., Poole. pp. 1296–1305.

References

External links
Wistuba.com
Photograph

German taxonomists
1967 births
Living people
Botanists active in Asia
Botanists active in South America
20th-century German botanists
21st-century German botanists
20th-century German scientists
21st-century German scientists